Never Alone, also known as  ("I am not alone"), is a puzzle-platform adventure video game developed by Upper One Games and published by E-Line Media based on the traditional Iñupiaq tale, "Kunuuksaayuka", which was first recorded by master storyteller Robert Nasruk Cleveland in his collection Stories of the Black River People. Swapping between an Iñupiaq girl named Nuna and her Arctic fox companion, the player completes puzzles in a story that spans eight chapters. The game was the result of a partnership between the Cook Inlet Tribal Council and E-Line Media. It is one of a growing number of video games produced by Indigenous people. A sequel was announced in February 2022.

Gameplay 

The player-character plays as the Iñupiaq girl Nuna and her Arctic fox. As an "atmospheric puzzle platformer", Never Alone puzzles entail swapping control between Nuna and the fox. While the fox is fast, Nuna can pick up things and open new areas using her bola. The story and its structure is based on the intergenerational transference of wisdom. Told in the form of an oral tale, unlike traditional platformer games, which involve overcoming obstacles and defeating enemies, Never Alone rewards players with collectible "cultural insights" - video vignettes of Iñupiaq elders, storytellers, and community members sharing their stories. The central plot revolves around discovering the source of the blizzard that has ravaged Nuna's village and restoring balance to nature. Other stories include that of Blizzard Man, the Little People, Manslayer, the Rolling Heads, and the Sky People.  It takes place in a harsh physical environment.<ref name="Polygon: wisdom">{{cite web |url=http://www.polygon.com/2014/5/9/5700434/never-alone-first-trailer-upper-one-games |access-date=June 23, 2014 |title=Never Alone'''s first trailer explains the importance of passing along wisdom |last=Farokhmanesh |first=Megan |date=May 9, 2014 |work=Polygon |publisher=Vox Media |archive-url=https://web.archive.org/web/20140614125740/http://www.polygon.com/2014/5/9/5700434/never-alone-first-trailer-upper-one-games |archive-date=June 14, 2014 |url-status=live }}</ref>

 Development Never Alone was developed by Upper One Games in conjunction with writer Ishmael Hope, a storyteller and poet of Iñupiaq and Tlingit heritage, and the Cook Inlet Tribal Council, a non-profit organization that works with indigenous groups living in Alaska's urban areas. The Council partnered with video game education company E-Line Media and generated the idea for Never Alone as part of a series that "shares, celebrates, and extends [indigenous] culture". The Council's for-profit Upper One Games is the "first indigenous-owned video game developer and publisher in US history". They built the game to explore "what it means to be human" and intergenerational stories. It is intended both to share the stories of native culture as entertainment, and to revitalize interest in Alaskan indigenous folklore.  Proceeds from the game will fund the Council's education mission.

E-Line Creative Director Sean Vesce was excited by the opportunity to "go into a community, learn more about a culture and then try to infuse their values and mythologies into a game".  Vesce and his team made "a dozen trips to Alaska" to meet with community members and gather stories and imagery and was "blown away at the richness and beauty and depth of that storytelling tradition". He realized that "none of that had really been ever explored in a videogame". Vesce previously held leadership positions at Crystal Dynamics and Activision. Vesce built and led a 12-member development team in Seattle, who worked in deep partnership with "40 Alaska Native elders, storytellers and community members" to craft the game. Never Alone was built in the Unity game engine. A local-cooperative mode is available.

 Reception Never Alone received many accolades including the British Academy Award for Best Debut game and Game of the Year and Most Significant Impact awards from the Games for Change organization. In 2015, Never Alone was also nominated for Outstanding Achievement in Game Direction from D.I.C.E., Best Debut from Game Developers Choice Awards, Matthew Crump Cultural Innovation Award from SXSW Gaming Awards. In 2014, Never Alone was an Official Selection Finalist at Indiecade. "Never Alone" also won an Interactive Narrative and Game + Play Peabody Award in 2021.Never Alone received "mixed or average" reviews, according to video game review aggregator Metacritic.

Critics positively noted the game's art design, which blends a simple, cartoon style with scrimshaw influences. The included documentary videos were also remarked upon as "[leaving the player] feeling educated as well as entertained" and "[doing] an excellent job of giving a cultural context" for the game.

The platforming elements of Never Alone were more divisive. Some reviewers described the game as "frustrating", noting imprecise controls and inconsistent behavior by in-game characters. However, other critics felt the gameplay was diverse and "satisfying".

In 2022 the Museum of Modern Art included the game in their exhibition Never Alone: Video Games and Other Interactive Design . 

Never Alone: Foxtales
The first expansion for the game, titled Never Alone: Foxtales'', was announced on July 16, 2015. Adding new levels and expanding upon the story, the expansion was released worldwide on July 28, 2015, for Microsoft Windows, PlayStation 4, and Xbox One. The expansion was also included with the base game at no additional cost for the Nintendo Switch on February 24, 2022.

References

External links
 
 E-Line Media

2014 video games
Indie video games
Puzzle video games
Side-scrolling video games
Environmental education video games
Multiplayer and single-player video games
Inupiat culture
IOS games
MacOS games
Linux games
Wii U games
Windows games
Platform games
Xbox One games
Wii U eShop games
PlayStation 3 games
PlayStation 4 games
PlayStation Network games
Nintendo Switch games
Android (operating system) games
Cancelled PlayStation Vita games
Video games based on Native American mythology
Video games about children
Video games about foxes
Video games featuring female protagonists
Video games set in Alaska
Video games developed in the United States
British Academy Games Award for Debut Game winners